The Zhongli Arts Hall is an arts center in Zhongli District, Taoyuan City, Taiwan.

History
The center was opened on 25 October 1985.

Architecture
 Concert hall
 Lecture hall
 Exhibition rooms

Transportation
The center is accessible within walking distance north of Zhongli Station of Taiwan Railways.

See also
 List of tourist attractions in Taiwan

References

External links

 

1985 establishments in Taiwan
Art centers in Taoyuan City
Art galleries established in 1985
Shen Yun